Beau Travail (French for "good work") is a 1999 French film directed by Claire Denis that is loosely based on Herman Melville's 1888 novella Billy Budd. The story is set in Djibouti, where the protagonists are soldiers in the French Foreign Legion. Parts of the soundtrack of the movie are from Benjamin Britten's 1951 opera based on the novella.

Synopsis
Adjudant-Chef Galoup of the French Foreign Legion reflects on his life from his home Marseille. He recalls his time in Djibouti, where he led a section of men under the command of Commandant Bruno Forestier. Galoup admired and envied many of Forestier's qualities, including his clear affection from the men, and retains a wristband with Forestier's name. Galoup has a Djiboutian girlfriend, and they often go out dancing.

One day, a new recruit named Gilles Sentain joins Galoup's section. Galoup harbors an immediate and seemingly irrational hostility towards Sentain, and vows to destroy him. When Sentain hands a canteen of water to another soldier who is being punished by being forced to dig a large hole in the heat of the day, Galoup chastises Sentain and knocks the water from his hand. Sentain strikes Galoup, who retaliates by taking Sentain into the desert and ordering him to walk back to the base alone. However, Galoup had previously tampered with Sentain's compass, causing him to become lost and collapse from dehydration in the arid salt flats.

Sentain is ultimately found and rescued by locals, but never returns to the base and is presumed to have deserted. His compass is later found by the legionnaires at a local sale of salt-encrusted novelties, and is believed to prove Sentain is dead. On the assumption that Galoup has either killed or attempted to kill Sentain, Galoup is sent back to France by Forestier for a court martial, ending his career in the Foreign Legion. He makes his bed in the immaculate military manner, then lies on top clutching a pistol, and reads aloud the phrase tattooed on his chest: "" ("Serve the good cause then die"). The film ends with Galoup at a night club in Djibouti, engaging in a lively acrobatic solo dance to "The Rhythm of the Night".

Cast
 Denis Lavant - Adjudant-Chef Galoup
 Michel Subor - Commandant Bruno Forestier
 Grégoire Colin - Légionnaire Gilles Sentain
 Richard Courcet - Légionnaire
 Nicolas Duvauchelle - Légionnaire

Subor played a character with the same name 30 years earlier in Le petit soldat.

Production
In an interview, Denis said, "One of the cast had actually been in the Legion, so we took all their real exercises and did them together every day, to concentrate the actors as a group. We never said we were going to choreograph the film. But afterwards, when we started shooting, using Britten's music, those exercises became like a dance."

Reception
The film was highly acclaimed in the United States, topping the Village Voice'''s Film Critics' Poll in 2000, with Claire Denis also placing at #2 for best director. Jonathan Rosenbaum of the Chicago Reader rated it a "masterpiece," giving it the paper's highest rating of four stars. Charles Taylor of Salon.com wrote that "Beau Travail is the most extreme example of [Denis'] talent, baffling and exhilarating. I don't know when I've seen a movie that is in so many ways foreign to what draws me to movies and still felt under a spell." Peter Travers of Rolling Stone gave it the magazine's highest rating, calling it "unique and unforgettable." J. Hoberman of the Village Voice wrote that the film is "so tactile in its cinematography, inventive in its camera placement, and sensuous in its editing that the purposefully oblique and languid narrative is all but eclipsed." Film scholar Erika Balsom wrote that the ending sequence "is perhaps the best ending of any film, ever," explaining that "Galoup finds a rhythm of life that follows none of the patterns of colonial, patriarchal power the film so skilfully traces and complicates...he inhabits a utopia of movement without rules".

The review aggregator website, Metacritic, gave the film a score of 91/100 based on 20 reviews, which they characterized as "universal acclaim." Rotten Tomatoes, another aggregator, reports an 86% approval rating based on 43 reviews, with a weighted average of 7.8/10. The site's consensus reads: "Beau Travail finds director Claire Denis drawing on classic literature to construct a modern tragedy fueled by timeless desires".Variety magazine named Beau Travail as one of The 100 Greatest Movies of All Time (No. 69). In the 2022 Sight and Sound critic’s poll, Beau Travail'' was ranked the 7th best movie of all time.

References

External links 
 
 
 
 Beau Travail at Turner Classic Movies
Beau travail: A Cinema of Sensation an essay by Girish Shambu at the Criterion Collection

1999 films
1999 LGBT-related films
Films based on American novels
Films based on works by Herman Melville
Films directed by Claire Denis
Films set in Djibouti
Films set in France
1990s French-language films
French LGBT-related films
Films about the French Foreign Legion
Gay-related films
1990s Italian-language films
1990s Russian-language films
1999 multilingual films
French multilingual films
1990s French films
Italian-language French films